John Wilkinson (1 April 1949 – 2007) was an English professional footballer who played as a full-back.

References

1949 births
2007 deaths
Footballers from Worksop
English footballers
Association football fullbacks
Grimsby Town F.C. players
Nantwich Town F.C. players
English Football League players